Héctor Uzziel Lozano Melchor is a Mexican football manager and former footballer who played as a forward. Recently was the manager of the Mexican Liga TDP club Potros UAEM. As a footballer, he spent most of his career playing for Toluca.

Career
Lozano was born in Tonalá, Jalisco on 27 November 1981. He played his youth career at the Toluca Academy and made his professional debut in Primera División on 24 September 2000 for Toluca in a match against Morelia.

As part of the Toluca squad, Lozano won the Apertura 2002 and Apertura 2005 tournaments.

Lozano had a brief spell playing in Uruguay for Fénix in 2003, where he was part of the squad that played that year Copa Libertadores.

In 2019, Lozano was appointed as manager of the Liga TDP club Potros UAEM.

Honours

Club
Toluca
Mexican Primera División: Apertura 2002, Apertura 2005

References

1981 births
Living people
Association football forwards
Mexican footballers
Liga MX players
Deportivo Toluca F.C. players
Centro Atlético Fénix players
Leones Negros UdeG footballers
Mexican football managers